The 2010 season of the ASFA Soccer League was the thirtieth season of association football competition in American Samoa. Pago Youth won the championship, their second recorded title, with the winners of the 2006 league competition and a number of previous seasons unknown.

All games were played at the Kananafou Theological Seminary College Sports Field due to the FFAS soccer field in Pago Pago undergoing improvements due to the damage after the 2009 Samoa earthquake and tsunami.

Format
Fifteen teams competed in the league divided into two groups, one of seven, the other of eight teams. The top two teams in each group qualified automatically for the quarter final stage. Teams that finished in positions three to six in each group qualified for a preliminary round to determine the other four teams to compete in the quarter finals. The group stage was played on a round robin basis and all knockout rounds were one-legged.

Pool A

Table

Results

Pool B

Table

Results

Knockout stage

Preliminary round

Quarter finals

Semi finals

Third place match

Final

References

FFAS Senior League seasons
Amer
football